Roger Williams Park Museum of Natural History and Planetarium is a natural history museum and planetarium within Roger Williams Park in Providence, Rhode Island.

History
The park and museum are named after Roger Williams, the founder of Providence, Rhode Island, and are located on land donated by Williams family.  The museum is part of the Providence Parks. It was founded in 1896. The building was designed in late 1893 by Martin & Hall, and construction began the following year. in 1914-15 a northern wing was added, also to the designs of Martin & Hall.

Exhibits

 Circle of the Sea: Re-Visited and Re-Imagined - The South Pacific Ocean.
 Seismic Shifts: Earth through Time - The museum's collections.
 Urban Wildlife: Nature at Your Doorstep - Urban wildlife
 Seismic Shifts: Earth through Time

The Cormack Planetarium offers regular showings.

See also
Roger Williams Park
Roger Williams (theologian)

References

External links
 Website
 
 

Museums in Providence, Rhode Island
Museums established in 1896
Planetaria in the United States
Natural history museums in Rhode Island
1896 establishments in Rhode Island
Science museums in Rhode Island